Asthenoptycha sphaltica is a species of moth of the family Tortricidae. It is found in Australia in the states of New South Wales and Victoria.

Adults have dark brown-and-white wings, with a pale mark on the inner margin of each forewing. The hindwings are a uniform pale grey.

External links
Insects of Australia

Tortricinae
Moths of Australia
Moths described in 1910